Red barberry is a common name for several plants and may refer to:

Berberis haematocarpa
Berberis thunbergii